Trichoptilium is a monotypic genus containing the single species Trichoptilium incisum, which is known by the common names yellowdome and yellowhead. This is a plant in the daisy family which is native to the Mojave and Sonoran Deserts of the United States and Mexico.

Description
Trichoptilium incisum sends up stems from a basal rosette of sharply-toothed leaves which are covered in curly hairs and oil glands. Atop each stem is a small rounded bright yellow flower head with only disc florets. Each head is a hemispherical button about a centimeter in diameter. The fruit is bristly with pappus.

References

External links
 
 Jepson Manual Treatment - Trichoptilium incisum
 Trichoptilium incisum - Photo gallery

Helenieae
Monotypic Asteraceae genera
Flora of the California desert regions
Flora of Nevada
Flora of Arizona
Flora of the Sonoran Deserts
Natural history of the Mojave Desert
Taxa named by Asa Gray